Jason of Mayno (Giasone de Mayno) (1435–1519) was an Italian jurist. With his pupil Filippo Decio he was one of the last of the Bartolist commentators on Roman law.

Life
He was considered to be the illegitimate son of the patrician Andreotto del Maino. He was brought up in Milan, and taught at the University of Pavia from 1471 to 1485. After a few years in Padua he returned to Pavia, where in 1507 he made a speech welcoming Louis XII of France. In that year Andrea Alciato came to Pavia to study with him and others.

Works

Notes

External links
WorldCat page
CERL page
 chieracostui.com
Complete works and editions by Giasone del Maino at ParalipomenaIuris

1435 births
1519 deaths
15th-century Italian jurists
16th-century Italian jurists